Pavel Nersessian (Russian: Павел Тигранович Нерсесьян, born August 26, 1964) is a Russian classical pianist. He is an Honored Artist of the Russian Federation and Professor of the Moscow Conservatory State Conservatory after P.I. Tchaikovsky and Boston University.

Biography 
Pavel Nersessian was born in Ramenskoye, a town outside Moscow, Russia Federation on August 26, 1964. In 1971-1982 he studied at the Central Music School (Class by V. Levin). In 1973 he made his debut by playing the Concerto No. 5 in F minor, BWV 1056 by Johann Sebastian Bach with the orchestra in the city of Gorky. After graduating from high school with honors, in 1982 he entered the Moscow Conservatory (class of Sergei Dorensky).

Teaching activity 

Upon graduating from the Moscow Conservatory in 1987 he was proposed to teach there. He began his teaching job as an assistant to Sergei Dorensky and as a concertmaster of the Children's Music School number 60 in Moscow. 

In 2013 he became a professor of piano in Boston University.

Into the world arena

Being one of the most remarkable pianists of his generation in Russia, he is known for his ability to play equally convincing in the whole palette of the piano repertoire. He has won prizes in every piano competition he has entered, including Beethoven Competition in Vienna in 1985, Paloma O’Shea Competition in Santander and Tokyo Competition. He made his American debut in 1993 at Alice Tully Hall, which the New York Times called "impressive" with "a gift for softly colored expressiveness," but lacking "a major intellectual challenge."

Concert activity 

Nersessian has served on international juries, including the Dublin International Piano Competition (Ireland), International Festival of Classical Music and Competition of Young Pianists (Kazakhstan), and Summit Music Festival (USA).

Recordings 
Pavel Nersessian has recorded disks with compositions of Chopin, Schumann, Schubert, Brahms, Tchaikovsky, Beethoven, Shostakovich etc. The album with compositions of Schumann «Kreisleriana», opus 16, Chopin 24 preludes, opus 28, performed by Pavel Nersessian was released on at Moscow Conservatory in 1995.

Discography 

 Tchaikovsky - The Sleeping Beauty / Schubert, Scarlatti, Scriabin, Schumann, Moszkowski, Rachmaninov - (CD) Pavel Nersessian 2005, Bel Air Music
 Rachmaninov - Russian Rhapsody / Dukas - L'apprenti sorcier / Debussy - Prelude / Bizet - Jeux d'enfants - Andrei Pisarev, Pavel Nersessian (CD) 2005, Bel Air Music
 Beethoven - Piano Concerto No. 4 - Pavel Nersessian / Sonata No. 32 - Andrei Tchistiakov (CD) 2005, Bel Air Music
 Beethoven - Concerto for Violin and Orchestra in D Major Op. 61, Sonata no. 14 in C sharp minor Op. 27/2 2005, Bel Air Music
 R.Schumann Kreisleriana, opus 16, F.Chopin 24 preludes opus 28, Pavel Nersessian, 1995 Moscow Conservatory

References

External links 
 
 Classic-online website - Pavel Nersessian  
 Pavel Nersessian plays Scriabin: Sonata No 7 Op 64. Interview.
 Concert videos - Pavel Nersessian 

1964 births
Living people
People from Ramensky District
Russian classical pianists
Male classical pianists
Prize-winners of the Paloma O'Shea International Piano Competition
Moscow Conservatory alumni
21st-century classical pianists
21st-century Russian male musicians